Yelena Grigorievna Stepanenko (born April 8, 1953, Stalingrad) is a  Soviet and Russian entertainer (conversational genre), actress, humorist, TV presenter, parodist, singer.

Biography
Since 1990 also starred in movies.

She was awarded  title Honored Artist of the Russian Federation (1995; for achievements in the field of art)  and  Order of Friendship (2015; for merits in the development of national culture and many years of fruitful activity).

Since 1985   spouse of the humorist and TV presenter Yevgeny Petrosyan. On July 4, 2018,   Stepanenko filed a civil suit for divorce and division of the joint property of the spouses.

References

External links 
 

1953 births
Living people
Musicians from Volgograd
Russian women comedians
Russian television presenters
Russian television actresses
Russian film actresses
Soviet film actresses
Soviet voice actresses
Russian voice actresses
Russian humorists
Women humorists
Russian parodists
Russian women singers
Honored Artists of the Russian Federation
Russian Academy of Theatre Arts alumni
Russian comedy musicians
Russian women television presenters
Actors from Volgograd
Mass media people from Volgograd